The Tibbie Stakes, is a Newcastle Jockey Club  Group 3 Thoroughbred  horse race for fillies and mares, at set weights with penalties, over a distance of 1400 metres, held at Broadmeadow Racecourse, Newcastle, New South Wales, Australia in September. Total prize money for the race is A$200,000.

History

Distance
 2005–2015 – 1400 metres
 2016 – 1350 metres
 2017 onwards - 1400 metres

Grade
2005–2012 -  Listed Race
2013 onwards - Group 3

Winners

 2022 - Hope In Your Heart
 2021 - Madam Legend 
 2020 - All Saints' Eve 
 2019 - Sweet Deal 
 2018 - Princess Posh 
 2017 - Zanbagh
 2016 - Spirit Bird
 2015 - She's Clean
 2014 - Fine Bubbles
 2013 - Vaquera
 2012 - Nocturnelle
 2011 - More Strawberries 
 2010 - Vintedge 
 2009 - Moti 
 2008 - Miss Pageantry 
 2007 - †race not held 
 2006 - Yolo 
 2005 - Shalimar Sky 

† Not held because of outbreak of equine influenza

See also
 List of Australian Group races
 Group races

References

Horse races in Australia
Newcastle, New South Wales